Tikhaya is a rural locality (a village) in Dobryansky District, Perm Krai, Russia. The population was 8 as of 2010.

Geography 
Tikhaya is located 88 km northeast of Dobryanka (the district's administrative centre) by road. Milkovo is the nearest rural locality.

References 

Rural localities in Dobryansky District